This is a list about the most expensive transfer fees paid or received by Chinese football clubs since the professionalism in 1994.

Highest transfer payments

All-time ranking 

As of 8 September 2020

Youth domestic players 

As of 1 March 2020

Goalkeepers 

As of 1 March 2020

References 

Transfer records
Records
Football transfer
China